Helle is a small village in Ålesund Municipality in Møre og Romsdal county, Norway.

References

Villages in Møre og Romsdal
Ålesund